Gradnitsa may refer to the following places in Bulgaria:

Gradnitsa, Dobrich Province
Gradnitsa, Gabrovo Province